The 2010 Hamilton Tiger-Cats season was the 53rd season for the team in the Canadian Football League and their 61st overall. The Tiger-Cats succeeded in making a second straight playoff appearance, as well as hosting a second straight playoff game, but lost the East Semi-Final to the Toronto Argonauts.

Offseason

CFL draft

Preseason

Regular season

Season standings

Season schedule

Roster

Awards and records

2010 CFL All-Stars

CFL Eastern All-Stars
 WR – Arland Bruce III, CFL Eastern All-Star
 WR – Dave Stala, CFL Eastern All-Star
 OC – Marwan Hage, CFL Eastern All-Star
 LB – Markeith Knowlton, CFL Eastern All-Star

Milestones

Playoffs

Schedule

Bracket

East Semi-Final

References

Hamilton Tiger-Cats seasons
Hamilton